The  is a rare breed of horse originating from Miyako Island, in Japan.

The Miyako is one of eight breeds considered native to Japan.  Miyako Island in Okinawa Prefecture has been known as a horse breeding area for centuries, and small horses have always been found in this area. During and after World War II they were crossed with larger stallions to increase their size to around 14 hands for farming purposes. They are mostly used as riding horses and for light draft work.

Around 1955, population of the breed peaked at around 10,000 head, but with the increase of motorization they began to decline. Since 1975 great efforts have been made to preserve the remaining few Miyako horses, as the breed is of great antiquity.  Only seven head were living as of 1983, the population grew to 25 horses by 1993, but had dropped back to 19 by 2001. The breed is protected by the Japanese government with its status listed as "Critical-Maintained."

Miyako horses are mostly bay or dun in colour and resemble the Mongolian horse.

See also

List of horse breeds

References

 Hendricks, Bonnie. International Encyclopedia of Horse Breeds, page 286

Horse breeds
Horse breeds originating in Japan